Longdon Road railway station served the hamlet of Darlingscott, Warwickshire. It was on the branch line from Moreton-in-Marsh to Shipston.

History
The station was originally opened on the Moreton in Marsh and Shipston Tramway, which was converted to a railway in 1889. The railway closed to passengers in 1929 but remained open for freight until 1960. The track has been dismantled.

Present day
The station is now in private ownership. The trackbed has been returned to agricultural use although it has been built on at Shipston-on-Stour end.

References

 Longdon Road at warwickshirerailways.com
 GWR Route: Moreton-in-Marsh to Shipston-on-Stour
 The Shipston-on-Stour Branch by Stanley C Jenkins and Roger Carpenter - Warwickshire Railways
 Shipston-on-Stour Branch
 Shipston-on-Stour Branch
 The Shipston on Stour Branch
 Rail Album - Stratford-upon-Avon & Moreton-in-Marsh Railway - Page 3

Disused railway stations in Warwickshire
Railway stations in Great Britain opened in 1836
Railway stations in Great Britain closed in 1960